The Serpulidae are a family of sessile, tube-building annelid worms in the class Polychaeta. The members of this family differ from other sabellid tube worms in that they have a specialized operculum that blocks the entrance of their tubes when they withdraw into the tubes. In addition, serpulids secrete tubes of calcium carbonate. Serpulids are the most important biomineralizers among annelids. About 300 species in the family Serpulidae are known, all but one of which live in saline waters. The earliest serpulids are known from the Permian (Wordian to late Permian).

The blood of most species of serpulid and sabellid worms contains the oxygen-binding pigment chlorocruorin. This is used to transport oxygen to the tissues. It has an affinity for carbon monoxide which is 570 times as strong as that of the haemoglobin found in human blood.

Empty serpulid shells can sometimes be confused with the shells of a family of marine gastropod mollusks, the Vermetidae or worm snails.  The most obvious difference is that serpulid shells are dull inside, whereas the molluscan vermetid shells are shiny inside.

Selected genera

Amplicaria Knight-Jones, 1984
Anomalorbis Vine, 1972
Apomatus Philippi, 1844
Bathyvermilia Zibrowius, 1973
Bushiella Knight-Jones, 1973
Capeospira Pillai, 1970
Chitinopoma Levinsen, 1884
Circeis Saint-Joseph, 1894
Crucigera Benedict, 1887
Dextralia Knight-Jones, 1973
Ditrupa Berkeley, 1835
Eulaeospira Pillai, 1970
Ficopomatus Sauthern, 1921
Filograna Berkeley, 1835
Filogranella Ben-Eliahu and Dafni, 1979
Filogranula Langerhans, 1884
Galeolaria Lamarck, J.B. de (1818)
Hyalopotamus Marenzeller, 1878
Hydroides Gunnerus, 1768
Janua Saint-Joseph, 1894
Josephella Caullery and Mesnil, 1896
Leodora Saint-Joseph, 1894
Metavermilia Bush, 1904
Neodexiospira Pillai, 1970
Neovermila Day, 1961
Nidificaria
Paradexiospira Caullery and Mesnil, 1897
Paralaeospira Caullery and Mesnil, 1897
Pileolaria Claparede, 1870
Placostegus Philippi, 1844
Pomatoceros Philippi, 1844
Pomatoleios Pixell, 1912
Pomatostegus Schmarda, 1861
Protolaeospira Pixell, 1912
Protula Risso, 1826
Pseudochitinopoma Zibrowius, 1969
Pseudovermilia Bush, 1907
†Rotularia Defrance, 1827
Salmacina Claparede, 1870
Semivermila Imajima, 1978
Serpula Linnaeus, 1767 Type genus
Simplicaria Knight-Jones, 1973
Spirobranchus Blainville, 1818 
Spirorbis Daudin, 1800 
Turbocavus Prentiss et al., 2014 
Vermiliopsis Saint-Joseph, 1894Vinearia''

References
Citations

General

 
Annelid families
Extant Permian first appearances
Taxa named by Constantine Samuel Rafinesque